Bodø Cathedral is a cathedral of the Church of Norway in Bodø Municipality in Nordland county, Norway.  It is located in the town of Bodø. It is the church for the Bodø domkirke parish which is also the seat of the Bodø domprosti (deanery) and the seat of the Bishop of the Diocese of Sør-Hålogaland. The concrete church was built in a long church basilica style in 1956 using plans drawn up by the architects Gudolf Blakstad and Herman Munthe-Kaas. The church seats about 850 people.

History
The town of Bodø was established in 1816, but it did not receive its own church for quite some time. The nearby Bodin Church served the town and surrounding area for quite some time before a church was built in the town.  Construction on a new church in the town of Bodø began in 1887 and it was consecrated on 6 January 1888. The building was designed by the architect Jacob Wilhelm Nordan. It was a yellow, wooden, neo-Gothic long church with a tower on the west end.

The church was destroyed on 27 May 1940 when the whole city center of Bodø was bombed during World War II. In 1946, an architectural competition was held for the design of a new church, which was won by the architects Gudolf Blakstad and Herman Munthe-Kaas. The foundation stone was laid in 1954, and the new church which was consecrated by Bishop Wollert Krohn-Hansen on 14 October 1956. By the time it was completed, it had become the cathedral for the new Diocese of Sør-Hålogaland, which was established in 1952.

Bodø Cathedral is built of concrete and has a basilica design. The church has an external sculpture depicting Petter Dass made by Kristoffer Leirdal. The sanctuary seats about 890 people. There is also a memorial to those who died from Bodø during the World War II. The inscription reads  which means "To those from Bodø who gave their lives for Norway during the war and occupation 1940–1945. Not named, not forgotten."

Picture gallery

See also
List of churches in Sør-Hålogaland
List of cathedrals in Norway

References

Cathedrals in Norway
Lutheran cathedrals in Norway
Churches in Nordland
Churches in Bodø
Churches completed in 1956
20th-century Church of Norway church buildings
1888 establishments in Norway
Long churches in Norway
Concrete churches in Norway